Parliamentary elections were held in Greece on 16 May 1869. Supporters of Thrasyvoulos Zaimis won a majority of the 187 seats. Zaimis remained Prime Minister, having assumed office on 6 February.

Results

References

Greece
Parliamentary elections in Greece
1869 in Greece
Greece
1860s in Greek politics